The Time of Your Life is a British television series made by ITV Productions for ITV, and aired in the summer of 2007.

The drama series tells the story of Kate (portrayed by Genevieve O'Reilly) who has awoken from an 18-year coma to find the world that she once knew has slipped away.

Initially she is unable to come to terms with the fact her parents are older and her friends look so different.

But as the weeks go by she adjusts to a world with the internet, mobile phones and global companies. Kate is also shocked by her friends, especially Sally (Anna Wilson-Jones), with whom she briefly lives. She also is unaware that her parents were on the verge of divorce when she woke. For their part, Eileen (Geraldine James) and Toby (Robert Pugh) are pretending nothing was awry.

However, Kate's life will never be resolved until she discovers the truth of why she was assaulted at the school leaving party 18 years previously. All her friends seem to have reasons why they want to forget that night. Kate needs to know why she survived and her fellow school pupil Brian Wellings was killed. Brian's father, Jack, follows Kate to try and discover the truth.

The series also stars Olivia Colman, who plays Amanda, one of Kate's childhood friends who has married her teacher, Joe Duttine, playing Joe, who had a crush on Kate when they were younger and Mark Bazeley as Pete, Kate's childhood sweetheart, who has become a successful businessman, with a fiancée, Emma (Jemima Rooper).

Kate later ends up together with Amanda's son Dexter (Augustus Prew).  Another cast member is David Westhead.

The series aired on the Seven Network in Australia between August and October 2007.

External links
.
.

2007 British television series debuts
2007 British television series endings
2000s British drama television series
ITV television dramas
2000s British television miniseries
Television series by ITV Studios
English-language television shows
Television shows produced by Granada Television
Television shows set in Surrey